Aitz Txiki is a peak of Biscay, Basque Country (Spain), 791 m. high. Its name means "small rock" aitz=rock txiki=small.

Description 
It is the smallest peak of the Urkiola range, and forms part of the same limestone mass that forms the Anboto and the Alluitz.

Although it is the smallest one, it has the same rough and wild look, especially when viewed from the Atxarte pass that separates the mountain from the neighbouring Untxillaitz. It has a double summit- the highest is Aitz Txiki and the lowest one is Artxua or Sorginkobetagana. It is rough and difficult from all sides except the one faced to Atxarte, which is the main access route. There are remains of a castle that was used to watch the Atxarte pass.

The main rock climbing ways of Biscay's climbing school are in its slopes.

Ascents 

From Atxarte (1h 30m): from the Zelaieta parish of Abadiano goes the road to Mendiola until the Atxarte pass, then the river is crossed and the route reaches the col of Asuntze soon left to reach the col of  Artola. From there the proper ascent to Aitz Txiki begins without major difficulties through steep meadows.

From Axpe (1h 30m): the path goes just under the Devil's Pass, from here the Alluitz can be seen. A path to the right leads to the col of Artola from where the route of Atxarte continues.

External links
 (es) Astxiki at wikineos (includes maps and many photos)
 (es) Mendikat 
 (es) Las montañas

Geography of Biscay
Basque Mountains
Mountains of the Basque Country (autonomous community)